A Place in the Sun may refer to:

 A place in the sun, a phrase used to refer to the German Empire's foreign policy (Weltpolitik) and colonial empire

Film and Television
 A Place in the Sun (1916 film), a British silent film
 A Place in the Sun (1951 film), an American dramatic film
 A Place in the Sun (British TV series) (2000–present), a British Channel 4 lifestyle programme about buying property abroad
 A Place in the Sun (2012 film), a Swedish film based on the Liza Marklund novel
 A Place in the Sun (South Korean TV series), a 2019 South Korean television series

Music
 A Place in the Sun (Lit album), 1999
 A Place in the Sun (Pablo Cruise album), 1977
 A Place in the Sun (Tim McGraw album), 1999
 "A Place in the Sun" (Stevie Wonder song), 1966
 "A Place in the Sun" (Pablo Cruise song), 1977
 "A Place in the Sun", a 1983 song by the Marine Girls, from their Lazy Ways album

See also
En plats i solen (disambiguation)
"A Place Under the Sun", a 1999 single by Miho Nakayama
Um Lugar ao Sol, a 2021 Brazilian telenovela
Un Lugar al sol, a 1965 Argentine film
Un posto al sole, a 1996 Italian soap opera